Koen Bouwman (born 2 December 1993 in Ulft) is a Dutch cyclist, who currently rides for UCI WorldTeam .

Career
Bouwman joined  in 2016 after riding for the team as a stagiaire the previous season. He competed in his first grand tour in 2016: the Vuelta a España. His first professional win was stage 3 of the 2017 Critérium du Dauphiné.  In May 2018, he competed in his first Giro d'Italia. In 2019, Bouwman won the mixed team relay with the Dutch team at the UCI Road World Championships. At the 2022 Giro d'Italia, Bouwman won two stages from the breakaway, giving him enough points to also win the mountains classification.

Major results

Road

2014
 4th Overall Carpathian Couriers Race
 10th Volta Limburg Classic
2015
 1st Stage 5 Giro della Valle d'Aosta
 1st  Mountains classification, Tour de Normandie
 4th Time trial, National Under-23 Road Championships
 6th Paris–Tours Espoirs
 7th Overall Oberösterreich Rundfahrt
2017
 Critérium du Dauphiné
1st  Mountains classification
1st Stage 3
 5th Time trial, National Road Championships
2018
 1st Stage 5 (TTT) Tour of Britain
 5th Overall Settimana Internazionale di Coppi e Bartali
 9th Gran Premio Bruno Beghelli
2019
 1st  Team relay, UCI Road World Championships
 1st  Team relay, UEC European Road Championships
 1st Stage 1 (TTT) UAE Tour
 4th Time trial, National Road Championships
 8th Overall Danmark Rundt
2020
 7th Overall Czech Cycling Tour
1st  Mountains classification
2021
 2nd  Team relay, UCI Road World Championships
 3rd  Team relay, UEC European Road Championships
 3rd Time trial, National Road Championships
 6th Overall Tour of Belgium
2022
 Giro d'Italia
1st  Mountains classification
1st Stages 7 & 19
 3rd Overall Okolo Slovenska
1st Stage 3

Grand Tour general classification results timeline

Track
2018
 2nd Individual pursuit, National Championships
2019
 2nd Individual pursuit, National Championships

References

External links
 

1993 births
Living people
Dutch male cyclists
Dutch Giro d'Italia stage winners
People from Oude IJsselstreek
Cyclists from Gelderland
UCI Road World Champions (elite men)
21st-century Dutch people